The Republican Party of South Sudan was a political party in the Republic of South Sudan.

Origins
The Sudan People's Liberation Movement (SPLM), the governing party of South Sudan, fractured in December 2013, leading to the ongoing civil war that has killed thousands and forced a large number of people to seek refugees in neighbouring countries. The party was formed on 22 June 2017 by senior officials who have split from the Sudan People's Liberation Movement (SPLM) faction allied to President Salva Kiir.

History
Former governor of the defunct Warrap state, Lewis Anei Madut, was heavily endorsed to be the party's new chairman. The new party's deputy chairman and secretary general were also elected at the same meeting of the founding members. Speaking at the official launch of the party, Lewis Anei Madut said "the Republican Party of South Sudan is a non-violent political organization formed after being inspired by the call to unite the country along a political party that aspires for equal rights of all the people of South Sudan.Members

Elected officials
Chairman:  Lewis Anei Madut - Former governor of the now defunct state Warrap''
Deputy Chairman: 
Secretary General:

Founding members
Anthony Agiem Akot
John Garang Dau USA-Chapter

See also 
 Sudan People's Liberation Movement

References

Sudan People's Liberation Movement
Political parties established in 2017
Defunct political parties in South Sudan
2017 establishments in South Sudan
Political parties disestablished in 2019